The Arrowfield 3YO Sprint, registered as the Royal Sovereign Stakes, is an Australian Turf Club  Group 2 Thoroughbred horse race, for three-year-olds at set weights over a distance of 1200 metres, held at Randwick Racecourse in Sydney, Australia in April during the ATC Championships Carnival. Total prize money for the race is A$1,000,000.

History

The race was first run in 1979 and was held in the summer. The registered racename is named in honour of Triple Derby winner Royal Sovereign, who won in 1964 the AJC Derby, VRC Derby and the Queensland Derby. In 2014 the ATC moved the race as part of ATC Championships Carnival in April substantially increasing the prizemoney and renaming the race.

Name
1979–2013 - Royal Sovereign Stakes
 2014 onwards - Arrowfield 3YO Sprint

Grade
 1979 - Principal Race
 1981–1995 -  Group 3
 1996 onwards - Group 2

Conditions
Prior to 2013 the race was restricted only to colts and geldings.Prior to 2006 the race was held with set weights with penalties.

Distance
1979–1996 – 1200 metres
1997–1998 – 1100 metres
1999–2003 – 1200 metres
2004 – 1180 metres
2005 onwards - 1200 metres

Venue
1979–1996 - Randwick Racecourse
1997–1998 - Randwick Racecourse Inner track
1999–2001 - Randwick Racecourse
 2002 - Warwick Farm Racecourse
2003–2011 - Randwick Racecourse
 2012 - Warwick Farm Racecourse
 2013 - Rosehill Racecourse
 2014 onwards - Randwick Racecourse

Winners

2022 - Mazu
2021 - Wild Ruler
2020 - Splintex
2019 - Classique Legend
2018 - Catchy
2017 - Derryn
2016 - Japonisme
2015 - Delectation
 2014 - Sidestep
 2013 - Rebel Dane
 2012 - Hot Snitzel
 2011 - Master Harry
 2010 - Shoot Out
 2009 - Youthful Jack
 2008 - El Cambio
 2007 - Mutawaajid
 2006 - Flying Pegasus
 2005 - Dance Hero
 2004 - Exceed And Excel
 2003 - Athelnoth
 2002 - Lonhro
 2001 - Assertive Lad
 2000 - Hire
 1999 - Lawyer
 1998 - Guineas
 1997 - Sovereign State
 1996 - Catalan Opening
 1995 - Danewin
 1994 - Rouslan
 1993 - Coronation Day
 1992 - Big Dreams
 1991 - All Archie
 1990 - Shaftesbury Avenue
 1989 - Ima Carpenter
 1988 - Dream Faith
 1987 - Imperial Baron
 1986 - Hula Chief
 1985 - Chimes Square
 1984 - All Chant
 1983 - Red Currant
 1982 - Best Western
 1981 - Trench Digger
 1980 - race not held
 1979 - Acamar

See also
List of Australian Group races
 Group races

External links 
First three placegetters Arrowfield 3YO Sprint (ATC)

References

Horse races in Australia
Randwick Racecourse